A canal engineer is a civil engineer responsible for planning (architectural and otherwise) related to the construction of a canal.

Canal engineers include:

China
 Yu the Great (c.2200BCE-c.2100BCE), first Dynast of China, founder of the first dynasty, who dedicated his life establishing flood control structures across the Chinese Hegemony, including canals, establishing the new hegemony in the process, across flood ruined competing kingdoms.
 Ximen Bao
 Li Bing (c. 3rd century BC), Dujiangyan

France
 Louis Maurice Adolphe Linant de Bellefonds (1799-1883), Suez Canal
 Ferdinand de Lesseps (1805-1894), Suez Canal and the failed first attempt at a canal in Panama

Hungary
 István Türr (1825-1908), Corinth Canal

United Kingdom
 James Brindley
 James Dadford
 John Dadford
 Thomas Dadford
 Thomas Dadford, Jr.
 Hugh Henshall
 John Hore
 Josias Jessop
 William Jessop
 Benjamin Outram
 John Rennie the Elder
 Thomas Sheasby
 John Smeaton
 William Smith
 Thomas Telford

United States
 James Geddes, Ohio and Erie Canal
 John B. Jervis, Delaware and Hudson Canal
 Loammi Baldwin, Middlesex Canal to Boston
 Orlando Metcalfe Poe, Poe Lock at Soo Locks
 William Weston
 Benjamin Wright, Erie Canal and the Chesapeake and Ohio Canal

See also
 List of civil engineers
 Lists of canals

Lists of engineers